Waghi (also spelled Wahgi) may refer to:

Geography
North Waghi Rural LLG
South Waghi Rural LLG
North Waghi District
Anglimp-South Waghi District
Waghi River

Languages
Wahgi language
Chimbu–Wahgi languages

People
Waghi Tumbe